The Gentlemen Put Us Here: About the Forced Relocations in Sweden is the first published book by Swedish journalist Elin Anna Labba. It won the 2020 August Prize for Non-Fiction.

References

Swedish non-fiction books
Swedish-language novels
Swedish non-fiction literature
August Prize-winning works
Norstedts förlag books
Swedish Sámi people
Reindeer